Adam Auclair (born March 29, 1996) is a professional Canadian football linebacker for the Ottawa Redblacks of the Canadian Football League (CFL).

University career

Auclair played U Sports football for the Laval Rouge et Or from 2016 to 2019. With Laval, he had 113.5 total tackles and seven interceptions. He was named a U Sports Second Team All-Canadian in 2016 and finished the year as a Vanier Cup champion following the team's victory in the 52nd Vanier Cup game where he also had an interception to contribute to the win.

In 2017, he was named a U Sports First Team All-Canadian and also won the Presidents' Trophy as the stand-up Defensive Player of the Year. He again played in the Vanier Cup, but the Rouge et Or lost to the Western Mustangs in the 53rd Vanier Cup.

While Auclair did not win any individual awards for the 2018 regular season, he won one of the most important ones during the post-season that year. In the 54th Vanier Cup game, he recorded 10.5 tackles, including an impactful tackle for a loss in the second half, and one interception as he won the Bruce Coulter Award as the defensive player of the game. He won his second national championship as the Rouge et Or defeated the Mustangs by a score of 34–20. In his final season, in 2019, Auclair played in eight regular season games where he had 41 tackles.

Professional career
Auclair was drafted in the first round, sixth overall, by the Ottawa Redblacks in the 2020 CFL Draft, but did not play in 2020 due to the cancellation of the 2020 CFL season. Instead, he signed with the team on February 12, 2021. He made the team's active roster following training camp and played in his first professional game on August 7, 2021, against the Edmonton Elks, where he had two special teams tackles. He played in 12 out of 14 regular season games in 2021 where he had 12 defensive tackles, eight special teams tackles, and one forced fumble.

In 2022, Auclair began the season as a backup, but earned his first start at linebacker on July 8, 2022, against the Saskatchewan Roughriders, where he had six defensive tackles. He continued to start at linebacker until he suffered a hand injury following the week 9 game against the Calgary Stampeders. After being placed on the injured list for six games, he returned to play as a backup linebacker in the Thanksgiving Day Classic against the Montreal Alouettes where he had four defensive tackles and two special teams tackles.

Personal life
Auclair's brother, Antony Auclair, plays as tight end and the two played together for one year, in 2016, with the Laval Rouge et Or.

References

External links
 Ottawa Redblacks bio

1996 births
Living people
Canadian football linebackers
Players of Canadian football from Quebec
People from Saint-Georges, Quebec
Laval Rouge et Or football players
Ottawa Redblacks players